Jan Cífka (12 April 1909 – 21 August 1978) was a Czech cross-country skier. He competed in the men's 18 kilometre event at the 1932 Winter Olympics.

References

External links
 

1909 births
1978 deaths
Czech male cross-country skiers
Czech male Nordic combined skiers
Czech male ski jumpers
Olympic cross-country skiers of Czechoslovakia
Olympic Nordic combined skiers of Czechoslovakia
Olympic ski jumpers of Czechoslovakia
Cross-country skiers at the 1932 Winter Olympics
Nordic combined skiers at the 1932 Winter Olympics
Ski jumpers at the 1932 Winter Olympics
Sportspeople from České Budějovice